The Peoria Mustangs are a USA Hockey-sanctioned Tier III ice hockey team in the North American 3 Hockey League (NA3HL). The team plays their home games at the Owens Center in Peoria, Illinois. The players, ages 16–20, carry amateur status under Junior A guidelines and hope to earn a spot on higher levels of junior ice hockey in the United States and Canada, Canadian major junior, collegiate, and eventually professional teams.

Alumni
The Mustangs have had many alumni move on to higher levels of junior ice hockey, NCAA Division I and Division III, ACHA college, and at professional levels, including:
 Logan Bittle - Bloomington PrairieThunder (IHL), US National Under 18 Team
 Aaron Dawson - Carolina Hurricanes 2003 NHL Entry Draft, Idaho Steelheads (ECHL)

References

External links
 Official website

Ice hockey teams in Illinois
Mustangs
2000 establishments in Illinois
Ice hockey clubs established in 2000